Mondsucht is a German electronic musical group. It was formed by Astrid M., Robert N. and Olaf K. in 1998.
The lyrics are in German and/or English, supported by male and female vocals.

History
Mondsucht formed in February 1998. Shortly after, they were signed to record label Alice In... of the Dark Dimensions label group 
and released their debut album "Der Totentanz" (German for The Death Dance).

In 2000, the band released their first full-length album Willkommen im Jenseits, which featured eight new tracks.

The band's next album, Für die Nacht gemacht was released two years later. Club hits like "Der Totentanz" and "Eiskalter Engel" 
gained Mondsucht increasing popularity among the German darkwave scene.

Allein unter Schatten, the latest album from Mondsucht appeared in 2004.

Line-up
 Robert N. - Male vocals, composition, production, programming, and lyrics
 Astrid M. - Female vocals and lyrics
 Olaf K. - Music and co-production

Discography

Albums
 2000: Willkommen im Jenseits
 2001: Nachtfalter
 2002: Für die Nacht gemacht
 2004: Allein unter Schatten

Exclusive tracks appearing on compilations
Ghosts from the Darkside Vol. 3 – "Verlies der Ewigkeit"
Devil Dance - Flash Club Hits -  "Gefangen Im Eigenen Ich"
Wellenreiter In Schwarz Vol. 4 – "Keine Gnade"
Nachtschwärmer 3 – "Dunkle Seelen"
Schattentanz I – "Bittersüßer Tod"
Sonic Seducer – Cold Hands Seduction Vol. III – "Der Totentanz"
Zillo Club Hits 5 – "Eiskalter Engel"
Nachtschwärmer 4 – "Keine Träume"
New Signs & Sounds 10/2004 (Zillo Compilation) - "Demon Lover"
Orkus Compilation 3 – "RIP"
Extreme Sündenfall 1 – "Gier"

External links
 Official Site 
 

German electronic music groups